National Route 183 is a national highway of Japan connecting Naka-ku, Hiroshima and Yonago, Tottori in Japan, with a total length of

See also

References

National highways in Japan
Roads in Hiroshima Prefecture
Roads in Tottori Prefecture